Wielewo  (German Willkamm) is a village in the administrative district of Gmina Barciany, within Kętrzyn County, Warmian-Masurian Voivodeship, in northern Poland, close to the border with the Kaliningrad Oblast of Russia.

The village has a population of 59.

Notable residents
 Viktor von Pressentin von Rautter (1896-1918), World War I flying ace

References

Villages in Kętrzyn County